R max, also written as Rmax with other variants possible, can refer to:

The Yamaha R-MAX unmanned helicopter
In the high performance LINPACK benchmarks of supercomputers it refers to the performance in GFLOPS for the largest problem run on a machine
 Maximal thermal resistance (Rmax), see thermal transmittance